Anupallavi is a 1979 Indian Malayalam film,  directed by Baby and produced by Reghu Kumar and Dheera. The film stars Jayan, Ravikumar, Srividya and Balan Kattoor in the lead roles. The film has musical score by K. J. Joy. The film has Jayan who is typically noted for his action hero roles display his flair for comedy.

Plot
Suresh (Jayan) and Radha (Srividya) get married after a whirlwind romance. However Suresh soon becomes enamored of the new typist Stella (Seema) in his office. He spins tales to convince Stella that his wife is a bed-ridden invalid with a terrible temper. He's also very sympathetic to Stella and helps her out in the treatment of her sick father. Radha soon learns that her husband is enamored of another woman while Stella learns that Suresh had been feeding her lies.

Cast
Jayan as Suresh
Srividya as Radha
Ravikumar
Seema as Stella
Bhavani
Sukumari
Balan Kattoor
Kuthiravattam Pappu
Nellikode Bhaskaran
Vallathol Unnikrishnan
Vijay Babu

Soundtrack
The music was composed by K. J. Joy and the lyrics were written by Bichu Thirumala and Vijayan.

References

External links
 

1979 films
1970s Malayalam-language films
Films scored by K. J. Joy
Films directed by Baby (director)